Pocola is a commune in Bihor County, Crișana, Romania with a population of 1,571 people. It is composed of five villages: Feneriș (Fenyéres), Petrani (Pontoskő), Pocola, Poietari (Kisfenyéres) and Sânmartin de Beiuș (Belényesszentmárton).

References

Pocola
Localities in Crișana